Prince Caspian and The Voyage of the Dawn Treader is the second series of The Chronicles of Narnia that ran from 1988 to 1990. The series, which was shown on BBC television in 1989, is an adaptation of two of C. S. Lewis's The Chronicles of Narnia novels: Prince Caspian (1951) and The Voyage of the Dawn Treader (1952).

Cast
Richard Dempsey as Peter Pevensie
Sophie Cook as Susan Pevensie
Jonathan R. Scott as Edmund Pevensie
Sophie Wilcox as Lucy Pevensie
Jean Marc Perret as Prince Caspian
Robert Lang as King Miraz
Angela Barlow as Queen Prunaprismia
Henry Woolf as Dr. Cornelius
Julie Peters (puppet performance) and Joanna David (voice) as Trufflehunter
George Claydon as Nikabrik
Big Mick as Trumpkin
William Todd-Jones as Glenstorm
Warwick Davis as Reepicheep
Ailsa Berk, William Todd-Jones and Tim Rose (puppet performance) and Ronald Pickup (voice) as Aslan
Joe McGann as Lord Glozelle
Rory Edwards as Lord Sopespian
Barbara Kellerman as Old Hag
Martin Stone as Wolfman
David Thwaites as Eustace Scrubb
Samuel West as King Caspian
John Hallam as Captain Drinian
Guy Fithen as Rhince
Neale S. McGrath as Rynelf
Marcus Eyre as Pug
Roger McKern as Tacks
Pavel Douglas as Lord Bern
Jared Morgan as Gatekeeper
John Quarmby as Gumpas
Ailsa Berk as Dragon
Jack Purvis and Kenny Baker as Dufflepuds
Preston Lockwood as Goriakin
Christopher Godwin as Lord Rhoop
Gabrielle Anwar as Princess
Geoffrey Bayldon as Ramandu

Production
Scenes for Prince Caspian were filmed at Arley railway station, Hawkstone Park and Pembroke Castle.

The parts of the series used in The Voyage of the Dawn Treader were filmed in Wales throughout summer 1989. The majority of the four Dawn Treader episodes were shot on location in Milford Haven, including scenes filmed aboard the Dawn Treader and for scenes set on Dragon Island. The cast and crew travelled to Tresco, Isles of Scilly for scenes taking place on fictional Doorn Island. Tresco Abbey Gardens and Plas Newydd stood in for Narrowhaven and Dufflepud Island respectively. The rest of the series was shot in Ealing Studios, including some scenes taking place on the deck of the Dawn Treader.

Warwick Davis portrayed the martial mouse Reepicheep in the production and would later go on to play the character of Nikabrik in the 2008 film Prince Caspian. According to Samuel West who played King Caspian, he stole one of Warwick Davis' latex prop noses and kept it after production ended. Despite having naturally curly hair, West also wore a wig during production.

Episodes

Prince Caspian

The Voyage of the Dawn Treader

Awards

1990
BAFTA for Best Children's Programme (Entertainment/Drama) - Nominated
BAFTA for Best Make Up - Nominated
BAFTA for Best Design - Nominated
BAFTA for Best Costume Design - Nominated
BAFTA for Best Video Lighting - Nominated
BAFTA for Best Video Cameraman - Nominated

References

External links

TV 1989
BBC children's television shows
Television shows based on children's books
1989 British television series debuts
1989 British television series endings
Television shows filmed in Wales
Television shows filmed in England